Petasida ephippigera (Leichhardt's grasshopper) is a pyrgomorph grasshopper, in the monotypic genus Petasida, native to tropical northern Australia. The species is named after Ludwig Leichhardt. It is known as alyurr in the Kundjeyhmi language.

It is bright orange with significant blue patches on its head and thorax, and black or very dark blue dappled spots on its abdomen.

References

Pyrgomorphidae
Orthoptera of Australia
Endemic fauna of Australia
Insects described in 1845
Taxa named by Adam White (zoologist)